Māris Urtāns (born 9 February 1981 in Riga) is a Latvian shot putter. His personal best throw is 21.63 metres, achieved on 19 June 2010 in Belgrade.

He finished ninth at the 2005 Summer Universiade and won the silver medal at the 2007 Summer Universiade. He also competed at the 2006 European Championships, the 2007 and 2009 World Championships, the 2008 Olympic Games and the 2012 Olympic Games without reaching the final.

Competition record

References

External links

1981 births
Living people
Latvian male shot putters
Athletes (track and field) at the 2008 Summer Olympics
Athletes (track and field) at the 2012 Summer Olympics
Olympic athletes of Latvia
Athletes from Riga
Universiade medalists in athletics (track and field)
Universiade silver medalists for Latvia
Medalists at the 2007 Summer Universiade